Schizolecis guntheri is a species of loricariid catfish (order Siluriformes) and the only known member of the monotypic genus Schizolecis.

Distribution and habitat
This species occurs mainly in coastal rivers of the Atlantic Forest in southeastern and southern Brazil. These fish inhabit streams with rocky and sandy bottom, mostly in shallows and backwaters up to 30 centimetres (12 in) deep, with slow water flow.

Appearance and anatomy
S. guntheri reaches a maximum length of  SL in males and 3 cm (1.2 in) SL in females. Normally pigmented specimens of S. guntheri have a dark background color on the body and caudal fin, with some light spots and an unpigmented ventral body surface. These fish have been found in an albino form in their natural habitat.

Ecology
S. guntheri forage mostly during the day, though some night activity has also been recorded. These fish graze on microscopic algae, mostly diatoms and green algae growing on rocks and submerged vegetation. They occasionally take chironomid and simuliid larvae. Before grazing on a patch with dense sediment, a fish makes wiggling head-down movements to dislodge sediment. When scraping algae off the substrate, it makes vigorous mouth movements, and moves by jerky movements probably related to its mouth alternating between grazing and attaching to the substrate. Grazing leaves characteristic, parallel and elongated marks on the substrate.

References

Otothyrinae
Freshwater fish of Brazil
Endemic fauna of Brazil
Taxa named by Alípio de Miranda-Ribeiro
Fish described in 1918